John Gomes is an American luxury real estate broker, entrepreneur, and businessman based in New York City. Alongside his business partner, Fredrik Eklund, he operates brokerages in Manhattan and Sweden. They have continually appeared on the Bravo television series, Million Dollar Listing New York. Gomes and Frederik Eklund were voted the top agents in New York City by The Real Deal in 2014.

Early years
Gomes went to university in New York City and attained a Bachelor of Arts degree in both Political Science and Communication Studies. He also holds an MBA in Entrepreneurship.

Career
Gomes, along with his real estate partner Fredrik Eklund, sell luxury apartments, buildings, and developments in both New York City and Sweden. Their real estate group has been selling since 2005.

Gomes appeared on the HGTV series, Selling New York. In 2010, his real estate team left the network to appear on Bravo's Million Dollar Listing New York.

In 2012, his real estate team grossed US$5.3 million in commissions.

Awards in Real Estate
Pinnacle Club Award

References

External links

American real estate businesspeople
21st-century American businesspeople
Businesspeople from New York (state)
People from Manhattan
Year of birth missing (living people)
Living people